The National Autonomous University of Nicaragua (UNAN) is the main state-funded public university of Nicaragua.

Its main campus is located in Managua. The original campus, UNAN-Leon, is located in León and is now secondary, mainly used for medicine majors.

2018–2020 Nicaraguan protests
UNAN was the site violent clashes during the 2018–2020 Nicaraguan protests. Protesters fortified the UNAN campus, but were forced to retreat when the university was attacked by paramilitaries aligned with the government.

Organization
The university is divided into five faculties:

 School of Medical Science
 Faculty of Education and Humanities
 Faculty of Economic Science
 POLISAL (Health Polytechnic)
 Faculty of science and engineering

See also 
 Education in Nicaragua
 List of universities in Nicaragua
 List of colonial universities in Latin America

References

External links
 UNAN Website 

UNAN
1812 establishments in the Spanish Empire
1812 establishments in North America
Buildings and structures in Managua